Brian Colvin (born 20 September 1978) is a Scottish football referee, who has officiated in the Scottish Premier League and Scottish Professional Football League.

References 

Scottish football referees
1978 births
Living people
Place of birth missing (living people)
Scottish Football League referees
Scottish Premier League referees
Scottish Professional Football League referees